Roland Meier (born 22 November 1967) is a Swiss former cyclist. He competed in two events at the 1992 Summer Olympics. On 28 August 2001, he was suspended for eight months because he tested positive for EPO.

Major results

1990
 1st Stage 1 Ronde de l'Isard
 3rd Overall Grand Prix Guillaume Tell
1991
 3rd Overall Flèche du Sud
1992
 2nd Overall Grand Prix Guillaume Tell
 2nd Schynberg Rundfahrt
1993
 1st Stausee Rundfahrt
 1st Schynberg Rundfahrt
 1st Stages 6 & 8 Tour of Austria
 1st Stage 4 Tour du Vaucluse
 2nd Time trial, National Road Championships
 2nd GP Lugano
 8th Milano–Torino
1995
 1st  Time trial, National Road Championships
 10th Overall Route du Sud
1996
 1st Schynberg Rundfahrt
 8th Overall Tour de Normandie
1997
 1st Stage 2 Grand Prix Guillaume Tell
 3rd Overall Regio-Tour
 5th Overall Tour de Suisse
1998
 2nd Wartenberg Rundfahrt
 3rd Time trial, National Road Championships
 5th Overall Euskal Bizikleta
 5th Overall Tour de Romandie
 6th Overall Tour de Suisse
 7th Overall Tour de France
 8th Overall Circuit Cycliste Sarthe
1999
 5th Classique des Alpes
 7th Overall Euskal Bizikleta
2000
 8th Overall Tour de Romandie

Grand Tour general classification results timeline

References

1967 births
Living people
Swiss male cyclists
Cyclists at the 1992 Summer Olympics
Olympic cyclists of Switzerland